Yekaterinburg-City (Yekaterinburg-Siti) is a commercial district near the center of the city of Yekaterinburg, Russia. It is located on Boris Yeltsin Street on the embankment of the Iset River and is currently under development. The area occupies five hectares.

The project's architectural planning and design belonged to French architectural bureau ValoDia and Pistre. The project's primary investor is UMMK-Holding. Construction would be responsible to Deputy Mayor for Construction and Architecture, Vladimir Kritskii. The project combines about 450,000 square meters of commercial space, offices, hotels, entertainment centers, cafes, and restaurants. The plans include 12 buildings: four office towers, a commercial area to accommodate typical small and average-sized businesses, a so-called trading gallery and two hotels.

Construction of Yekaterinburg-City started in 2007 and was scheduled to complete in 2014. Progress had a setback in 2014 due to the Russian financial crisis but government officials stated that it would still be finished by 2014. However, two skyscrapers of Yekaterinburg-City were finished over the expected completion date of 2014 in 2015.

Yekaterinburg-City currently has three skyscrapers, one hotel, and two high-rises.

Buildings

Iset Tower 

Iset is a 52-story residential skyscraper in Yekaterinburg-City. The skyscraper's height is 209 meters, and its total floor area is 80,983 square feet. Construction of the skyscraper began in 2010 and completed in 2015. Named after the Iset River which goes through central Yekaterinburg.

Iset is currently the tallest building of Yekaterinburg, the second tallest building in Russia outside of the capital city of Moscow, and the 16th tallest building in Russia.
 Total Area: 
 Total Investment: $230 million
 Floors: 52
 Height: 
 Construction began: 2010
 Construction completed: 2015

De Luxe 
De Luxe is a 43-story residential skyscraper in Yekaterinburg-City. The skyscraper's height is 138.79 meters. Construction of the skyscraper began in 2006 and completed in 2010. 
 Floors: 43
 Height: 
 Construction began: 2006
 Construction ended: 2010

Business House "Demidov" 
Demidov Plaza is a 35-story office skyscraper in Yekaterinburg-City. The skyscraper's height is 130.15 meters. Construction of the skyscraper began in 2007 and completed in 2015.
 Total Area: 
 Floors: 35
 Height: 
 Construction began: 2007
 Construction completed: 2015

Sverdlovsk Oblast Government Building 
The Sverdlovsk Oblast Government Building is a 22-story office high-rise used by the federal state of Sverdlovsk Oblast in Yekaterinburg-City. The skyscraper's height is 91.44 meters. Construction of the high-rise was completed in 1982.
 Floors: 22
 Height: 
 Construction completed: 1982

Hyatt Regency Hotel 
The Baron de Gennin Hyatt Regency Ekaterinburg is a 21-story 5 star hotel owned by Hyatt Regency, a brand of Hyatt, in Yekaterinburg-City. The high-rise's height is 83 meters. Construction of the high-rise began in 2005 and completed in 2009.
 Total Investment: $107 million
 Floors: 21
 Height: 
 Construction began: 2005
 Construction ended: 2009

President 
President is a 20-story office high-rise in Yekaterinburg-City. The high-rise's height is 82 meters. Construction of the high-rise was completed in 2013.
 Floors: 20
 Height: 
 Construction ended: 2013

See also 
 Commercial district
 Moscow International Business Center
 Lakhta Center

External links and sources 
 Valode&Pistre
 Ekaterinburg-City.com - Projects and photos
 Photos of "Yekaterinburg-City"
 Renaissance construction — Photographes.

References

Buildings and structures in Yekaterinburg
Financial districts in Russia